Wang Dong (born 4 February 1986) is a Chinese butterfly swimmer.

Career
At the 2006 Asian Swimming Championships in Singapore, Wang won two gold medals. In the 100 metre butterfly event he won gold in 53.92 and with Ouyang Kunpeng, Xie Zhi and Huang Shaohua won gold in the 4×100 metre medley relay in a new championship record time of 3:42.04.

One month later at the 2006 World Short Course Championships in Shanghai, Wang finished 16th in the 50 metre butterfly equal 28th in the 100 metre butterfly and in the final of the 4 × 100 metre medley relay the Chinese quartet of Wang, Ouyang Kunpeng, Xie Zhi and Huang Shaohua initially finished in 5th place with a time 3:31.73, but were later disqualified.

In December 2006, at the 2006 Asian Games in Doha, Wang won three medals. He won bronze in both the 50 m and 100 m butterfly and with Ouyang Kunpeng, Lai Zhongjian and Chen Zuo won silver in the 4 × 100 metre medley relay.

The following year at the 2007 World Aquatics Championships, Wang finished 31st in the 50 metre butterfly, 27th in the 100 metre butterfly, and with Ouyang Kunpeng, Lai Zhongjian and Chen Zuo finished 13th in 4 × 100 metre medley relay.

References

1986 births
Living people
Chinese male butterfly swimmers
Asian Games medalists in swimming
Swimmers at the 2006 Asian Games
Asian Games silver medalists for China
Medalists at the 2006 Asian Games
Asian Games bronze medalists for China
20th-century Chinese people
21st-century Chinese people